The Pennsylvania Classic was a golf tournament on the PGA Tour, held from 2000 through 2006 at three different Pennsylvania courses. The event's final title sponsor was lumber company 84 Lumber. The host course from 2003 to 2006 was Mystic Rock near Farmington, designed by Pete Dye and part of the Nemacolin Woodlands Resort, owned by 84 Lumber founder Joseph Hardy.

Before the move to Mystic Rock, it was played outside Philadelphia in 2000 and 2002 at Waynesborough Country Club in Paoli, with the 2001 event at Laurel Valley Golf Club in Ligonier.

The hole flags used during the tournament were American flags.

Teenager Michelle Wie accepted an invitation by Wie family friend and 84 Lumber owner Joe Hardy to play in the 2006 tournament. It was her sixth attempt to make a cut in a PGA Tour event and third attempt in 2006. It was expected that Wie's involvement would help draw fans to the event. Wie shot 14 over par over the first two rounds, finishing 23 strokes behind the leaders and last among all competitors who completed two rounds.

The 84 Lumber Company announced in April 2006 that it would no longer host the Classic. Hardy's daughter, Maggie, explained the situation as the sponsorship of tournament being unfair to the thousands of 84 Lumber employees who had recently been laid off, and also unnecessary because the purpose of the tournament was to entertain clients — which the company could do at any other golf tournament.

Winners

References

Former PGA Tour events
Golf in Pennsylvania